The USCG 65' small harbor tug is a class of fifteen tugs used by the United States Coast Guard for search and rescue, law enforcement, aids-to-navigation work and light icebreaking. They were designed with steel hulls to replace the  wooden-hulled tugs that had been in service since the 1940s and were built by Gibbs Gas Engine Company, Jacksonville, Florida; Barbour Boat Works of New Bern, North Carolina; and Western Boat Builders Corporation, Tacoma, Washington from 1961 to 1967. They were originally powered by a single 400 horsepower diesel engine, however several have been re-powered with 500 horsepower main drive engines since they were constructed.

Ships

Notes
Footnotes

Citations

References cited

 
 
 
 
  
 
 
 
     
 

Ships of the United States Coast Guard
Auxiliary tugboat classes